Pieter Dixon (born 17 October 1977 in Harare, Zimbabwe) is a Zimbabwean-born South African rugby union footballer, who plays hooker for Bath.  He was educated at Maritzburg College, and was captain of the South African Schools' rugby team in 1995.  He is the nephew of Vintcent van der Bijl, who represented South Africa at cricket in the 1980s.

After previously playing provincial and Super 12 rugby in South Africa, Dixon signed for Bath for the 2005–2006 season. He made an immediate impact when scoring a try in a Powergen Cup game against Bristol. Dixon is said to be a mobile hooker with good set-piece skills. His scrummaging is renowned and his lineout work garnered him praise whilst in South Africa and now in the Aviva Premiership. Dixon signed a two-year extension to his contract during January 2008, taking him through to end of the 2009/10 season.  Bath Rugby announced in December 2009 that Dixon had signed a further two-year extension to his contract, along with extensions for Matt Banahan and David Barnes, taking him to the end of the 2011/12 season.

References

External links
Bath sign Stormers hooker Dixon

1977 births
Living people
South African rugby union players
Zimbabwean rugby union players
Bath Rugby players
Alumni of Maritzburg College
Rugby union hookers
Stormers players
Western Province (rugby union) players
Sharks (Currie Cup) players
South Africa international rugby union players